Cletrac Peak is a conspicuous steep-sided peak at the northwest corner of Larsen Inlet, immediately north of Muskeg Gap, in Graham Land, 4.3 km east of Skidoo Nunatak and 4 km south of Maslarov Nunatak. It was mapped from surveys by the Falkland Islands Dependencies Survey (1960–61), and named by the UK Antarctic Place-Names Committee after "Cletrac" tractors made by the Cleveland Tractor Company, Ohio, the first to be used successfully in the Antarctic, by Admiral Byrd's second expedition (1933–35).

References
 

Mountains of Graham Land
Nordenskjöld Coast